Violeta is a 2022 novel by Chilean-American author Isabel Allende. It is a fictional autobiographical account of the life of Violeta Del Valle and how she witnessed the various upheavals of the 20th century. Violeta in the book recalls all she has seen and experienced in an unnamed South American country spanning 100 years.

Plot 
Violeta tells the story of the author Violeta Del Valle. Violeta was born in 1920 amid the Spanish flu epidemic in an unnamed South American country. She was the youngest daughter of her family and had five older brothers. The book depicts the scene during the 2020 pandemic, where Violeta is breathing her last as a ripe old woman of 100 years. She writes a letter to her grown up grandson telling him about her multiple difficulties. The story starts with Violeta being born in an influential family on a stormy night. Soon though her father loses everything in the Great Depression and the family had to relocate from the comforts of their mansion in the capital to the modest rural countryside. In a way Violeta reminds of Isabel's earlier work, The House of Spirits, which dealt with personal and political upheaval spanned over decades. Violeta also tells about the coups and military uprisings and similar horror of 1970s which seemed to encapsulate the whole of South America. Violeta has a long passionate but troubled relationship with her former husband and the father of her son. Her son is a journalist who has come into the government's Black books because of his career. Thus to escape he first seeks asylum in Argentina and then in Norway. After this tumultuous period in her life, Violeta finally find a partner and solace in a retired diplomat who is also a naturalist. The book deals with a vivid 100-year-story that contains surviving a pandemic, the great depression, loss of familial wealth, political upheavals, marriage problems, estrangement and eventual peace.

Reception
Violeta received positive and assuring reviews from most major sources. The New York Times hailed Violeta  "Violeta chronicles a feminist awakening amid twin repressive forces, the state and the domestic sphere, in passages whose sheer breadth is punctuated by sometimes stilted, explanatory dialogue".

References

2022 Chilean novels
Novels by Isabel Allende
Ballantine Books books